Muhlenbergia asperifolia is a species of grass known as alkali muhly and scratchgrass. It is native to much of North America, including most of southern Canada, most of the continental United States except for the southeastern region, and parts of northern Mexico. It also grows in South America.

Description

Cultivation
Muhlenbergia asperifolia is a valuable grass for habitat restoration and revegetation projects in disturbed habitat in the southwest United States, especially in riparian zones in California and the Intermountain West. It is planted with alkali sacaton (Sporobolus airoides) for Mojave River and other riparian zone restoration in the Mojave Desert. It produces a dense groundcover once established.

References

 
 Grass Manual Treatment

External links
 

asperifolia
Flora of North America
Flora of South America